The NCSU Insect Museum is the center for research and training in insect systematics and biodiversity informatics at North Carolina State University. The Museum's collections hold more than 1.5 million specimens, with major emphases on the insects of North Carolina and on the Auchenorrhyncha and Aphididae (Hemiptera) of the world. A smaller but historically important part of the collection (especially for bees of the eastern USA) is dedicated to Hymenoptera.

History 

Deitz (1983a and 1983b) provides the most comprehensive reviews of the history of the NCSU Insect Museum. Insect reference collections started growing soon after the foundation of NC State University in 1889, with each individual collection being cared for by one curator. These multiple independent collections across campus were then collated into a single resource in 1952, then referred to as the Entomology Museum. This effort was organized by Zeno P. Metcalf, an Auchenorrhyncha systematist who served as the Insect Museum's first director.

This museum has since been referred to as the NCSU Insect Museum, and it continues to serve as a resource for entomologists who need to identify specimens, for researchers attempting to understand more about species distributions through time, for students learning insect taxonomy, and as a repository for vouchers that reference entomological research.

References

External resources 
 North Carolina State University
 North Carolina State University Entomology Department and graduate program
 NCSU Insect Museum website
 Guide to the North Carolina State University, Department of Entomology Drawings and Papers 1926-2000
 NCSU LSID - urn:lsid:biocol.org:col:1024
 Guide to the North Carolina State University, Department of Entomology Film Collection 1980
 Zoomable image of pinned insects from the NCSU Insect Museum

North Carolina State University
Museums in Raleigh, North Carolina
Natural history museums in North Carolina
University museums in North Carolina
Entomological organizations
1952 establishments in North Carolina
Museums established in 1952